Galliano is an Italian surname. Notable people with the surname include:

Cecilia Galliano (born 1978), Argentine-Mexican actress, model, and TV presenter
Giuseppe Galliano (1846–1896), Italian army officer
John Galliano (born 1960), British fashion designer
Richard Galliano (born 1950), French accordion player

Italian-language surnames